This is a list of people executed in the United States in 2001. Sixty-six people were executed in the United States in 2001. Eighteen of them were in the state of Oklahoma, while only seventeen of them were in the state of Texas. Three (Wanda Jean Allen, Marilyn Kay Plantz, and Lois Nadean Smith) were female; all three were executed in Oklahoma. One notable execution was of domestic terrorist Timothy McVeigh, who was responsible for carrying out the Oklahoma City bombing in 1995. McVeigh's execution was the first to be carried out by the United States federal government since 1963. Only one execution occurred in September, as several were postponed due to the September 11 attacks. The attack on the Pentagon caused federal offices, including the United States Supreme Court, to shut down.

List of people executed in the United States in 2001

Demographics

Executions in recent years

See also
 List of death row inmates in the United States
 List of most recent executions by jurisdiction
 List of people scheduled to be executed in the United States
 List of women executed in the United States since 1976

References

List of people executed in the United States
executed
People executed in the United States
2001